Hickory Creek is a tributary of the Little Missouri River in Pike and Hempstead Counties in Arkansas, in the United States. The creek defines much of the border between the two counties. Its GNIS I.D. number is 50048.

References

Rivers of Arkansas
Little Missouri River (Arkansas)